Marie-Laure Norindr (born 17 June 1991 in Paris), also known as Kayane, is a French esports player and journalist. She specializes in fighting games, in particular in the Dead or Alive, Soulcalibur and Street Fighter series, and has been playing competitively since 2001. Since then, according to Guinness World Records in 2011, she has been the most successful female participant in fighting game tournaments, especially regarding the Soulcalibur games. She is currently sponsored by Red Bull.

Biography

Marie-Laure Norindr was born on 17 June 1991 in Paris and grew up in Argenteuil, a north-western suburb. She is of Laotian and Vietnamese descent and her nickname Kayane comes from conjunction of the names of Dead or Alive characters Kasumi and Ayane.

Kayane has played video games since her early childhood, interested in a variety of genres. In 2001, she won the second place in France's vice-champion in Dead or Alive 2 at an age of nine; it was the first tournament that she has ever participated in. Since then, she has competed in scores of gaming competitions in France and around the world (over 80 in total by 2012), winning many of them; her Major League Gaming record includes second place in Soulcalibur V in 2012. She has been a member of the Mad Catz pro gaming team and was sponsored by eLive.pro. In 2014, Kayane became the first electronic athlete from France to be sponsored by Red Bull.

Kayane has co-organized various gaming events (including charity events and "Kayane Session" events), became a brand ambassador for the French Soulcalibur V launch event and advertisement campaign, and worked as an esports writer and journalist. Since October 2013, she has been co-hosting the TV show Game One e-Sports on French television channel Game One. As of 2012, Norindr has been studying business; she said she sees herself in esports for ten more years "before starting a family."  In 2020 she started a series of French Soulcalibur VI tournaments titled Kayane Cup. In April 2021 she co-hosted the WePlay eSports Ultimate Fighting League Soulcalibur VI event, a high-profile invitational hosted in Kyiv.

Accolades
In 2012, Kayane entered Guinness World Records in the categories "First Female Super Street Fighter IV World Champion" (EVO 2010, playing as Chun-Li, regarded by Kayane as a personal role model) and "Most Podium Placements in a Fighting-Game Tournament for a Female (2001-2011)". According to Guinness, she has been ranked top three in 42 fighting games tournaments by 2011. Guinness World Records Gamer's Edition also awarded her the title of "Most Successful Female SoulCalibur Player" for her 48 Soulcalibur series podium placements between 2002 and 2012.

In 2009, Namco created a tribute AI named "Kayane" for the character Xianghua (Kayane's favourite Soulcalibur character) in Soulcalibur: Broken Destiny, imitating Kayane's playing style. A character named "Kayane" appeared in 2012's Soulcalibur V. In 2012, Forbes called Kayane "the most consistently successful female fighting game competitor of the 21st century," and French magazine Le Point called her the "queen of fighters"; in 2013, Complex included her beating members of the audience without looking at the screen among the "most incredible performances in video games".

Tournament record

References

External links

 
 (old account)

1991 births
Cosplayers
Fighting game players
French esports players
French people of Laotian descent
French people of Vietnamese descent
French sports journalists
French women journalists
French television presenters
Living people
Soulcalibur players
Sportspeople from Argenteuil
Street Fighter players
Women esports players
French women television presenters
Esports journalists